Bendtsen's Bakery is a historic Danish cuisine bakery in Racine, Wisconsin. It was established in 1934 and is known for its kringles. The bakery has been featured on Michael Stern's roadfood.com, Food Network's Road Tasted,  Discover Wisconsin,  Eat Your Way Across the USA, and Day Trips from Chicago.

References

Buildings and structures in Racine, Wisconsin
Tourist attractions in Racine, Wisconsin
Bakeries of the United States
1934 establishments in Wisconsin
Restaurants established in 1934